Ugreshskaya is a station on the Moscow Central Circle that opened in September 2016.

Name
The station's name from the street, Ugreshskaya Ulitsa, in which it is situated. The name comes from the nearby Nikolo-Ugreshsky Monastery and is shared with a station on the Moscow Railway's Little Ring line.

Originally, the name of the station was planned to be Volgogradskaya; however, the city renamed it in August 2016, prior to opening.

Transfer
From January 2017, passengers may make out-of-station transfers to Volgogradsky Prospekt station on the Metro's Tagansko-Krasnopresnenskaya Line. Initially a free transfer was not organized due to the considerable remoteness of these two stations. This is the longest transfer between the MCC and Metro line in the entire system, the average transit time is nearly 12 minutes.

References

External links 
 mkzd.ru

Moscow Metro stations
Railway stations in Russia opened in 2016
Moscow Central Circle stations